Southern Province is one of Rwanda's five provinces. It was created in early January 2006 as part of a government decentralization program that re-organized the country's local government structures.

Southern Province comprises the former provinces of Gikongoro, Gitarama, and Butare, and is divided into the districts of Huye, Ruhango, Nyamagabe, Gisagara, Muhanga, Kamonyi, Nyanza, and Nyaruguru.

The capital city of Southern Province is Nyanza.

Notes and references

External links
Southern Province official website

 
Provinces of Rwanda
States and territories established in 2006